Chi Him Wong, also known as Wong Chi Him (born 8 April 1994) is a Hong Kong professional squash player. As of April 2017, he was ranked number 79 in the world. In 2017 he won the Malaysian Squash Tour and the Squash Challenge Cup PSA professional tournaments.

References

1994 births
Living people
Hong Kong male squash players